The 1982 WAFU Club Championship was the sixth football club tournament season that took place for the runners-up of each West African country's domestic league, the West African Club Championship. It was won by Ghana's Sekondi Hasaacas with a two-legged final victory against Spartans of Owerri of Nigeria. The runner-up was AS Police of Senegal. It featured 14 clubs and 26 matches. A total of 52 goals were scored.

Preliminary round
The matches took place from May 31 to June 14.

|}

Intermediary Round
The matches took place from June 20 and July 4.

|}

Semifinals
The matches took place from July 18 to August 1

|}

Finals
The matches took place on 16 and 30 October.

|}

Winners

See also
1982 African Cup of Champions Clubs
1982 CAF Cup Winners' Cup

References

External links
Full results of the 1982 WAFU Cup at RSSSF

West African Club Championship
1982 in African football